The Laputa Nunataks are a range of nunataks and snow-covered hills with minor rock outcrops, rising from about  to over , and located  northwest of Adie Inlet on the east side of Graham Land, Antarctica. They were first charted by the Falkland Islands Dependencies Survey and photographed from the air by the Ronne Antarctic Research Expedition in 1947. They were named by the UK Antarctic Place-Names Committee after Laputa, the flying island in Jonathan Swift's Gulliver's Travels.

References

Nunataks of Graham Land
Oscar II Coast